The 2019–20 season was Fleetwood Town's 112th season in their history and sixth consecutive season in League One. Along with League One, the club also participated in this season's editions of the FA Cup, EFL Cup and EFL Trophy.

The season covers the period from 1 July 2019 to 30 June 2020.

Transfers

Transfers in

Loans in

Loans out

Transfers out

Pre-season
The Cod Army has announced pre-season friendlies against Wrexham, Port Vale, Carlisle United, Burnley and Preston North End.

Competitions

League One

League table

Results summary

Results by matchday

Matches
On Thursday, 20 June 2019, the EFL League One fixtures were revealed.

Play-offs

FA Cup

The first round draw was made on 21 October 2019. The second round draw was made live on 11 November from Chichester City's stadium, Oaklands Park. The third round draw was made live on BBC Two from Etihad Stadium, Micah Richards and Tony Adams conducted the draw.

EFL Cup

The first round draw was made on 20 June.

EFL Trophy

On 9 July 2019, the pre-determined group stage draw was announced with Invited clubs to be drawn on 12 July 2019. The draw for the second round was made on 16 November 2019 live on Sky Sports. The third round draw was confirmed on 5 December 2019.

Statistics

|-
!colspan=14|Players out on loan:

|-
!colspan=14|Players who left the club:

|}

Goals record

Disciplinary record

References

Fleetwood Town F.C. seasons
Fleetwood Town